Noortje (full name Noortje Visser) is a Dutch gag-a-day humor comic strip created in 1975 for the Dutch girls' magazine Tina. The script is by Patty Klein and the drawings are by Jan Steeman.   It is currently one of the longest-running Dutch comics series  and with 41 years the longest-running Dutch comics series made by the same writer/artist team. In 2016 Steeman resigned and was succeeded by his son Lucas Steeman; he died on January 24, 2018, of kidney-failure. Patty Klein died on 15 March 2019.

Concept

Noortje stars a young, red-haired teenage girl with freckles. Each episode is a self-contained story in which she usually makes a huge blunder or ends up in an embarrassing situation.

Characters

 Noortje Visser: A young girl who is very clumsy and a bit naïve. She has a love for animals, but suffers from arachnaphobia and dislikes cleaning up her room. She is often late for school. Originally the character was about 12 or 13 years old, but she is nowadays around 16.
  Sander: Her brother, whom she feels annoyed with.
 Marlies: Noortje's best friend.

Albums

The first nine albums were published by De Geïllustreerde Pers, the following five by VNU Tijdschriften. Since 2002 all albums are published by Sanoma.
 Kan die muziek zachter? (1994)
 Streng verboden te lezen! (1995)
 Hij houdt van me… Hij houdt niet van me… (1995)
 Béregezellig! (1996)
 Duizend keer lachen (1996)
 Noortje kookt over (1996)
 Altijd uitgelaten (1997)
 Een pláátje (1997)
 Versiert het weer (1997)
 Blundert voor tien (1998)
 Gaat mobiel (1999)
 ...En niemand anders! (2000)
 In beeld (2000)
 Altijd opgeruimd (2001)
 Zet ‘m op! (2002)
 Spettert (2003)
 Steelt de show (2004)
 Ziet ze vliegen (2005)
 Mooi is dat! (2006)
 Laat van zich horen (2007)
 Om te zoenen (2008)
 In volle vaart (2009)
 Stapelgek! (2010)
 Het beste van (2011)
 Bakt ze bruin! (2012)
 Maakt het mooier (2013)
 Om te aaien (2014)
 Lang zal ze leven! (2015)

Sources

Dutch comic strips
1975 comics debuts
Dutch comics characters
Gag-a-day comics
Teen comedy comics
Female characters in comics
Teenage characters in comics
Comics characters introduced in 1975
Comics set in the Netherlands
Fictional Dutch people